Carlos Soares Garrit (born December 4, 1971) is a former Brazilian football player.

Club statistics

References

External links

1971 births
Living people
Brazilian footballers
Brazilian expatriate footballers
J1 League players
Kashima Antlers players
Expatriate footballers in Japan
Association football midfielders